Alejandro Enrique Valdés Tobier (born November 18, 1988) is a Cuban freestyle wrestler. He competed in the men's freestyle 65 kg event at the 2016 Summer Olympics, in which he was eliminated in the repechage by Haislan Garcia.

He represented Cuba at the 2020 Summer Olympics.

He competed in the 65kg event at the 2022 World Wrestling Championships held in Belgrade, Serbia.

References

External links
 

1988 births
Living people
Cuban male sport wrestlers
Olympic wrestlers of Cuba
Wrestlers at the 2016 Summer Olympics
World Wrestling Championships medalists
Wrestlers at the 2019 Pan American Games
Pan American Games medalists in wrestling
Pan American Games gold medalists for Cuba
Medalists at the 2019 Pan American Games
Wrestlers at the 2020 Summer Olympics
21st-century Cuban people
Sportspeople from Havana